John Charles Schafer (May 7, 1893 – June 9, 1962) was a U.S. Representative from Wisconsin.

Born in Milwaukee, Schafer fought in the First World War in France, serving for twenty-two months. In 1921, he was elected to the Wisconsin State Assembly before running for Congress a year later. Schafer was first elected to Congress as a Republican to the 68th Congress representing Wisconsin's 4th congressional district. He was then reelected to the four succeeding Congresses (March 4, 1923 – March 3, 1933).

He lost his reelection bids in 1932, and failed in 1934 and 1936 to regain his old seat. In 1938, with the Democrats divided, he regained his old seat for the Seventy-sixth Congress. In 1940 he was again ousted by Democrat Thaddeus Wasielewski (whom he'd narrowly beaten in 1938), coming in third behind Wasielewski and Progressive former state senator Leonard C. Fons (Wasielewski polled 57,381 votes [35.62%]; Fons 52,907 [32.84%] and Schafer 50,796 [31.53%]). Schafer unsuccessfully contested the election results.

Schafer ran unsuccessfully for the Republican nomination for the Senate in 1957 to fill the vacancy left by the death of Joseph McCarthy.

Schafer returned to private life and died in Pewaukee in 1962.

External links
 

1893 births
1962 deaths
Republican Party members of the Wisconsin State Assembly
Politicians from Milwaukee
People from Pewaukee, Wisconsin
Republican Party members of the United States House of Representatives from Wisconsin
20th-century American politicians